Ionuț Eugen Țenea (born 21 March 1996) is a Romanian professional footballer who plays as a defender for Dunărea Călărași.

Honours
Dunărea Călărași
Liga II: 2017–18

References

External links
 
 
 Ionuț Țenea at lpf.ro

1996 births
Living people
People from Constanța County
Romanian footballers
Association football defenders
Liga I players
Liga II players
FC Dunărea Călărași players
CS Aerostar Bacău players